Mud cake can refer to:

 Mississippi mud pie, a type of dessert.
 Kladdkaka, a chocolate mud cake eaten in Sweden and Finland.
 Geophagy, the practice of eating soil-like substances.

It also doubles as a general synonym of mudpie, which has several meanings.